Continuous test-driven development (CTDD) is a software development practice that extends test-driven development (TDD) by means of automatic test execution in the background, sometimes called continuous testing.

Practice
In CTDD the developer writes a test first but is not forced to execute the tests manually. The tests are run automatically by a continuous testing tool running in the background. This technique can potentially reduce the time waste resulting from manual test execution by eliminating the need for the developer to start the test after each phase of the normal TDD practice: after writing the (initially failing) test, after producing the minimal amount of code for the test to pass and after refactoring the code.

Continuous testing tools

 Infinitest open source Eclipse and IntelliJ plug-in
 NCrunch commercial continuous testing plug-in for Visual Studio
 Autotest - continuous testing for Ruby
 AutoTest.NET - autotest for .NET
 AutoTest.NET fork for CTDD
 Mighty-Moose - packaged version of AutoTest.NET
 Wallaby.js - continuous testing for JavaScript/TypeScript/CoffeeScript
 PyCrunch — continuous testing for Python, with PyCharm plugin

References

External links 
 Continuous Test-Driven Development - A Novel Agile Software Development Practice and Supporting Tool

Extreme programming
Software development process
Software testing
Software development philosophies